Gisela Dulko and Flavia Pennetta were the defending champions but decided not to participate.
Vania King and Yaroslava Shvedova won the title, defeating Anastasia Rodionova and Galina Voskoboeva in the finals.

Seeds

Draw

Draw

References
 Main Draw

2011 Women's Doubles
Kremlin Cup - Doubles